Clavidesmus columbianus is a species of beetle in the family Cerambycidae. It was described by Stephan von Breuning in 1961. It is known from Colombia.

References

Onciderini
Beetles described in 1961